Viktor Georgiev (born 28 October 1973) is a retired Bulgarian footballer who played as a goalkeeper.

External links 
 

1973 births
Living people
Bulgarian footballers
First Professional Football League (Bulgaria) players
PFC Litex Lovech players
PFC Minyor Pernik players
PFC Slavia Sofia players
PFC Pirin Blagoevgrad players
Akademik Sofia players
FC Montana players
PFC Nesebar players
Association football goalkeepers